The Wissner Piano Company was opened in Brooklyn, New York in 1878 by Otto Wissner ("a thoroughly skilled piano maker") and his two sons, William Wissner and Otto Wissner, Jr. They were well known for the high quality of their pianos. The Wissner Company went out of business around 1942.

References

Piano manufacturing companies of the United States
Musical instrument manufacturing companies based in New York City
companies based in Brooklyn